Heinrich Urban (27 August 1837 – 24 November 1901) was a German violinist and composer.

Life and career
Heinrich Urban was born in Berlin, and studied with Ferdinand Laub, Hubert Ries and Friedrich Kiel. He sang alto in the Königlich Domchor and the Königlich Kapelle. He continued his studies later in Paris, and then worked as a violinist, composer and music teacher. He also served as conductor of the Berliner Dilettanten Orchester Verein (Amateur Orchestra Society). Noted students include harpsichordist Wanda Landowska, Polish pianist and composer Ignace Jan Paderewski, Polish composer Mieczysław Karłowicz, American composer Fannie Charles Dillon, American composer Maurice Arnold Strothotte, American composer and music critic Leonard Liebling, and Polish musicologist Henryk Opieński. He died in Berlin.

Works
Heinrich Urban wrote overtures, a symphony and symphonic poems, an opera and a violin concerto. He also wrote solo and chamber music for violin. Selected works include:

Frühling (Spring), symphony
Der Rattenfänger von Hameln, symphonic poem
Konradin, opera

References

Images, music example, list of Work (German)

1837 births
1901 deaths
19th-century classical composers
19th-century German composers
19th-century German male musicians
German male classical composers
German opera composers
German music educators
Male opera composers